Kaloyan Stoyanov (born 2 November 1986 in Blagoevgrad) is a Bulgarian footballer who plays as a forward.

References

External links

1986 births
Living people
Bulgarian footballers
First Professional Football League (Bulgaria) players
PFC Pirin Blagoevgrad players
OFC Pirin Blagoevgrad players
FC Septemvri Simitli players
FC Bansko players
Association football forwards
Sportspeople from Blagoevgrad